Gary Stal (born 9 February 1992) is a French professional golfer.

Career
Stal was born in Décines, near Lyon. He played on the Challenge Tour in 2012. He won his first title in June 2012 at the Kärnten Golf Open, playing on an invitation. The following month, Stal picked up another victory at the Credit Suisse Challenge, defeating Alexandre Kaleka in a playoff and graduated to the European Tour.  He was less successful in 2013, but performed well at the second and final stages of Qualifying School to regain his place on Tour.  He then finished 89th on the 2014 Order of Merit, making 21 cuts in 25 tournaments.

On 18 January 2015, Stal secured his first victory on a major tour, shooting a −7 in the final round to win the European Tour's Abu Dhabi HSBC Golf Championship by one stroke over Rory McIlroy.

Professional wins (5)

European Tour wins (1)

Challenge Tour wins (2)

Challenge Tour playoff record (1–0)

French Tour wins (2)

Results in major championships

CUT = missed the halfway cut

Results in World Golf Championships

"T" = Tied

Team appearances
Amateur
European Boys' Team Championship (representing France): 2009, 2010
European Amateur Team Championship (representing France): 2011

See also
2012 Challenge Tour graduates
2013 European Tour Qualifying School graduates
2022 European Tour Qualifying School graduates

References

External links

French male golfers
European Tour golfers
People from Décines-Charpieu
Sportspeople from Lyon Metropolis
1992 births
Living people